Ləngan (also, Lengyan and Lyangyan) is a village and municipality in the Masally Rayon of Azerbaijan. It has a population of 476.

References 

Populated places in Masally District